The Cathedral of Saint Peter is the mother church of the Roman Catholic Diocese of Wilmington. Located on West 6th Street in Wilmington, Delaware. the cathedral is in the Quaker Hill Historic District of the city.

Architectural history

Founding 
Saint Peter's Church was designed in 1816 by Pierre Bauduy, planner of the Wilmington town hall. The church cornerstone was laid in 1816; the 30- by 40-foot (9.1- by 12-meter) Romanesque-style building was executed in brick.

Saint Peter's was dedicated on September 12, 1818. The first mass was celebrated by Father Patrick Kenny on September 13, 1818.

1868 to 1905 renovations 
In 1868, Pope Pius IX erected the Diocese of Wilmington.  This action prompted the new diocese to prepare Saint Peter's for consecration as a cathedral.  Starting in 1870, the diocese added frescoes, a marble baptistery, three altars, a chancel railing, a barrel-domed roof, and a bishop's cathedra to the church.  The church's Munich-style stained glass was added around 1900.  The stained glass was probably created by Franz Xavier Zettler, master glass painter to the Royal Court of Bavaria or by his pupil, Franz Mayer.

Pro-cathedral designation 
When the church upgrades were finished in 1905, St. Peter's was ready to be consecrated as a cathedral by the apostolic delegate, Archbishop Diomede Falconio.  However, when Falconio arrived onsite, he saw that Saint Peter's was joined to a rectory and a school.  According to Vatican policies, a cathedral had to be a free-standing building.  Falconio instead designated Saint Peter's as a pro-cathedral, a church serving temporarily as a cathedral. The diocese eventually upgraded Saint Peter's and it was consecrated as a cathedral.

1981 and 1991 renovations 
The diocese renovated Saint Peter's in 1981 to repair structural damage and to modify the sanctuary to meet liturgical changes after the Second Vatican Council. Contractors added flying buttresses to support the transept walls in 1991, along with a steel substructure for the pillars and choir loft.

2007 renovations 
By 2007, new structural problems had arisen at Saint Peter's.  A plaster rosette fell from the ceiling into one of the pews. Leaks in the roof were spotted.  The diocese also wanted to fix a problem from earlier construction work.  Previous renovations had added two floor-to-ceiling metal poles to fortify the arches leading into the side chapels. These poles now blocked the view of the tabernacle in its new location in the cathedral.

Thanks to a grant from the Catholic Diocese Foundation, the diocese was able to replace the roof while keeping the cathedral open for worship. With the assistance of the cathedral's rector, Father Joseph Cocucci, the diocese undertook further renovations at Saint Peter's:

 The cathedra was moved to the side of the sanctuary
 The tabernacle was moved back to the center behind the altar. 
 A shrine to Mary, mother of Jesus was created that was accessible to those with physical disabilities 
 The baptismal font was positioned near the cathedral entrance.

On November 22, 2007, in a Thanksgiving Day service at Saint Peter's, Bishop Michael Saltarelli thanked Father Cocucci "for putting the Blessed Sacrament in His proper place and for putting the bishop in his proper place."

Rectors

The cathedral parish of Saint Peter has had sixteen rectors since its founding in 1804:

Rev. Patrick Kenny (1804–1840)
Rev. Patrick Reilly (1840–1850)
Rev. Jeremiah O'Donohoe (1851–1855)
Rev. Patrick Prendergast (1855–1859)
Rev. Patrick O'Brien (1859–1867)
Rev. Matthew McGrane (1867–1868)
Most Rev. Thomas A. Becker (1868–1886)
Msgr. John Lyons (1887–1916)
Msgr. John J. Dougherty (1916–1948)
Msgr. Joseph Sweeney (1949–1968)
Rev. John P. McLaughlin (1968–1977)
Rev. James E. Richardson (1977–1982)
Msgr. Paul J. Taggart (1982–1994)
Rev. William B. Kauffman (1995–2001)
Rev. Michael J. Carrier (2001–2005)
Rev. Joseph M. P. R. Cocucci (2006–present)

See also
List of churches in the Roman Catholic Diocese of Wilmington
List of Catholic cathedrals in the United States
List of cathedrals in the United States

References

External links 

Official Cathedral Site
Roman Catholic Diocese of Wilmington Official Site

Peter Wilmington
Roman Catholic churches in Wilmington, Delaware
Roman Catholic churches completed in 1818
19th-century Roman Catholic church buildings in the United States
Historic district contributing properties in Delaware
National Register of Historic Places in Wilmington, Delaware
Churches on the National Register of Historic Places in Delaware
Cathedrals in Delaware
1818 establishments in Delaware